The final of the Men's Hammer Throw event at the 2001 World Championships in Edmonton, Alberta, Canada was held on Sunday August 5, 2001. There were a total number of 32 participating athletes. The qualifying rounds were staged on Saturday August 4, with the mark set at 79.50 metres.

Medalists

Schedule
All times are Mountain Standard Time (UTC-7)

Abbreviations
All results shown are in metres

Startlist

Records

Qualification

Group A

Group B

Final

See also
 2000 Men's Olympic Hammer Throw (Sydney)
 2002 Men's European Championships Hammer Throw (Munich)
 2001 Hammer Throw Year Ranking
 2004 Men's Olympic Hammer Throw (Athens)

References
 Results
 IAAF
 hammerthrow.wz

Hammer
Hammer throw at the World Athletics Championships